Peru Township is one of the sixteen townships of Morrow County, Ohio, United States.  The 2010 census found 1,513 people in the township.

Geography
Located in the southwestern part of the county, it borders the following townships:
Lincoln Township - north
Bennington Township - east
Porter Township, Delaware County - southeast corner
Kingston Township, Delaware County - south
Brown Township, Delaware County - southwest corner
Oxford Township, Delaware County - west
Westfield Township - northwest

No municipalities are located in Peru Township.

Name and history
Peru Township was organized in 1817. The township was named after Peru, New York, the native home of a share of the early settlers. Originally part of neighboring Delaware County, Peru Township became part of Morrow County in 1848.  Statewide, the only other Peru Township is located in Huron County.

Government
The township is governed by a three-member board of trustees, who are elected in November of odd-numbered years to a four-year term beginning on the following January 1. Two are elected in the year after the presidential election and one is elected in the year before it. There is also an elected township fiscal officer, who serves a four-year term beginning on April 1 of the year after the election, which is held in November of the year before the presidential election. Vacancies in the fiscal officership or on the board of trustees are filled by the remaining trustees.

Notable natives
Richard Dillingham, anti-slavery activist

References

External links
County website

Townships in Morrow County, Ohio
Townships in Ohio
1817 establishments in Ohio
Populated places established in 1817